Richard Cust may refer to:

 Sir Richard Cust, 1st Baronet
Sir Richard Cust, 2nd Baronet, of the Cust baronets
Richard Cust (priest), clergyman, Dean of Rochester then Lincoln